Jørn C. Nissen (born 27 February 1949) is a Danish politician. He is a member of the Conservative People's Party, and was the mayor of Samsø Municipality from 2010 to 2013. He has been sitting in Samsø Municipality's municipal council since 1998.

References 

1949 births
Living people
Danish municipal councillors
Mayors of places in Denmark
Conservative People's Party (Denmark) politicians